The DataVault was Thinking Machines' mass storage system, storing five gigabytes of data, expandable to ten gigabytes with transfer rates of 40 megabytes per second. Eight DataVaults could be operated in parallel for a combined data transfer rate of 320 megabytes per second for up to 80 gigabytes of data.

Each DataVault unit stored its data in an array of 39 individual disk drives with data spread across the drives. Each 64-bit data chunk received from the I/O bus was split into two 32-bit words. After verifying parity, the DataVault controller added 7 bits of Error Correcting Code (ECC) and stored the resulting 39 bits on 39 individual drives. Subsequent failure of any one of the 39 drives would not impair reading of the data, since the ECC code allows any single bit error to be detected and corrected.

Although operation is possible with a single failed drive, three spare drives were available to replace failed units until they are repaired. The ECC codes permit 100% recovery of the data on any one failed disk, allowing a new copy of this data to be reconstructed and written onto the replacement disk. Once this recovery is complete, the data base is considered to be healed.

In today's terminology this would be labeled a RAID-2 subsystem. However, these units shipped before the label RAID was formed.

The DataVault was an example of unusual industrial design. Instead of the usual rectilinear box, the cabinet had a gentle curve that made it look like an information desk or a bartender's station.

References

External links
 

Computer storage devices
Thinking Machines Corporation